Cool Ganesha is a 2013 Indian Kannada-language romantic drama directed by Vasanth and starring Jaggesh in the titular role and Tashu Kaushik in her Kannada debut. The film was a box office failure.

Cast 
Jaggesh as Cool Ganesha
Tashu Kaushik as Anjanappa’s daughter
Shobaraj as Veerabhadra 
Jeevan as Agni Surya
Harry Joseph as Hebbet Anjanappa

Reception 
A critic from Rediff.com wrote that "Cool Ganesha is a cool entertainer and a good pastime for people who are looking for a comedy film to watch this weekend". A critic from The Times of India wrote that "the story is old wine in new bottle". A critic from Bangalore Mirror wrote that "Cool Ganesha is not cool at all. Instead, it’s a tepid comedy that can still be enjoyed on telly".

References